Cheongnyangni Station (청량리역) is a major train station located at Dongdaemun-gu, Seoul, South Korea. It serves as a terminus for passenger trains serving the eastern part of South Korea. KTX, ITX-Cheongchun, and Mugunghwa-ho trains terminates or stops at this station. Several Seoul Metropolitan Subway lines serve the station. These are: Seoul Subway Line 1, the Gyeongchun Line, the Suin-Bundang Line and the Gyeongui-Jungang Line.

The Gyeongchun Line extended from Sangbong Station to Cheongnyangni Station in September 2016, offering a transfer to Line 1, although only some services terminate here, with others terminating at Sangbong. A physical transfer between underground and aboveground stations opened on 20 August 2010.

Passenger trains serving the following Korail lines terminate at Cheongnyangni Station:

The Yeongdong Line and Taebaek Line to Gangneung, in Gangwon Province;
The Jungang Line to Andong in North Gyeongsang Province and Busan, to the southeast of Seoul.

In addition, this station is served by all ITX trains to/from Chuncheon Station on the Gyeongchun Line. However, the majority of trains do not terminate at this station but continue to Yongsan Station.

Vicinity

Line 1 
Exit 1: Cheongnyangni Grocery Market
Exit 2:
Exit 3: Miju APT
Exit 4: Cheongnyangni Train Station
Exit 5: Lotte Department Store Cheongnyangni
Exit 6: St. Paul Hospital

Aboveground Station 
Exit 1: Cheongnyangni Subway Station, Lotte Department Store Cheongnyangni

See also

 Cheongnyangni 588, a red-light district

References

External links
 Station information from Korail

Railway stations in Seoul
Railway stations opened in 1911
Metro stations in Dongdaemun District
Seoul Metropolitan Subway stations
1911 establishments in Korea